Barren Island is an island located in the Andaman Sea. It is the only confirmed active volcano in the Indian subcontinent, and the only active volcano along a chain of volcanoes from Sumatra to Myanmar.

History

The first recorded eruption of the volcano dates back to 1787. Since then, the volcano has erupted more than ten times, with the most recent one being in 2020. After the first recorded eruption in 1787, further eruptions were recorded in 1789, 1795, 1803–04, and 1852. After nearly one and a half century of dormancy, the island had another eruption in 1991 that lasted six months and caused considerable damage.

The 1991 eruption was particularly harmful to the island's fauna. A team from the Geological Survey of India visited Barren Island on 8–9 April 1993 to assess the impact of the eruption on the distribution, habit, and abundance of animal species. The report found that the eruption had reduced the number of bird species and their population. The team only observed 6 of the 16 known species of birds on the island. The Pied Imperial Pigeon (Ducula bicolor) was the most abundant among the 6 species observed. In a survey conducted at night, the team spotted one rat species (Rattus rattus) and 51 species of insects from eight orders. The report also noted that the volcano was still emitting gas at the time. There were eruptions in 1994–95 and 2005–07, the latter considered to be linked to the 2004 Indian Ocean earthquake. A lighthouse that was established in 1993 was destroyed by the recent eruptions.

A team from the National Institute of Oceanography spotted the volcano erupting on 23 January 2017. Abhay Mudholkar, the head of the team, said, "The volcano is erupting in small episodes of about five to ten minutes. During the day, only ash clouds were observed. However, after sundown, red lava fountains were spewing from the crater into the atmosphere and hot lava flowed streaming down its slopes."

Based on Argon-argon dating of samples from Barren Island, it is now established that the oldest subaerial lava flows of the volcano are 1.6 million years old and the volcano is located on an oceanic crust which is roughly 106 million years old. All recorded eruptions lie on the low end of the Volcanic Explosivity Index. The 2017 eruption was recorded as a 2 on the index.

Geography

This volcanic island stands in the midst of a volcanic belt on the edge of the Indian and Burmese tectonic plates. Narcondam Island is a dormant volcano in the area, apart from volcanic seamounts like Alcock and Sewell.
The remnant of the primitive volcanic cone forms a precipitous cliff around the island (commonly referred to as caldera wall), with a break towards the west.

Biodiversity
The island is protected area under Barren Island Wild Life Sanctuary.

True to its name, it has large areas of barren landscape. It is uninhabited by humans, though it has a small population of goats. Also birds like Pigeon, bats like flying foxes and a few rodent species such as rats are known to survive the harsh conditions.

A small population of feral goats also found on the island which surprised the geologist. Later it was found that they are surviving on two fresh water springs and thick vegetation. These goats were kept there by British sailors from a steamer leaving Port Blair in 1891.

Tourist attractions

The waters surrounding Barren Island are reputed to be among the world's top scuba diving destinations. Major attractions here are the crystal clear visibility, Manta Rays, interesting basalt formations, topography of past lava flows and fast growing coral gardens. This dive destination is remote but can be accessed by either a live aboard ship or with scuba-operators based at Swaraj Island.

Administration
It belongs to the North and Middle Andaman administrative district, part of the Indian union territory of Andaman and Nicobar Islands.

Demographics
The island is uninhabited.

Image gallery

See also

 List of volcanoes in India

References

External links

 Geological Survey of India : THE BARREN ISLAND VOLCANO
 Department of Earth Sciences, IIT Bombay
 
 Geological Survey of India

Islands of North and Middle Andaman district
Tourist attractions in the Andaman and Nicobar Islands
Uninhabited islands of India
Active volcanoes
Holocene stratovolcanoes
Polygenetic cinder cones
Calderas of Asia
Volcanoes of India
Volcanoes of the Indian Ocean
Islands of India
Islands of the Bay of Bengal